Alexe is a Romanian given name and family name that may refer to:

Given name 
 Alexe Dumitru (1935 - 1971), Romanian sprint canoer who competed in the late 1950s and early 1960s
 Alexe Gilles (born 1992 ). American-born Canadian figure skater
 Alexe Iacovici, Romanian sprint canoer who competed in the early 1960s
 Alexe Mateevici (1888 – 1917) was one of the most prominent Romanian poets in Bessarabia
 Alexe Bădărău (1922-1997), who later changed his name to Aleksi Ivanov and became a Bulgarian politician

Surname 
 Antonio Alexe (1969 - 2005), Romanian basketball player
 Dan Alexe (born 1961), Romanian journalist and filmmaker, known for his documentaries
 Florin-Alexandru Alexe (born 1979), Romanian economist and politician
 Ion Alexe (born 1946), heavyweight boxer from Romania, who won the silver medal at the 1972 Summer Olympics in Munich
 Marius Silviu Alexe (born 1990), Romanian footballer who plays as a left winger for Dinamo București

See also 
 Alexandreni (disambiguation)
 Alexandrescu (surname)
 Alexeni, name of several villages in Romania

Romanian masculine given names
Romanian-language surnames